Baron FitzReginald was a title in the Peerage of England. It existed as a feudal barony by tenure, before being created by Writ of summons to Parliament of John FitzReginald in 1294 until his death in 1310, when the title became extinct.

Feudal barony by tenure
Herbert FitzHerbert
Herbert FitzHerbert, son and heir
Peter FitzHerbert, son and heir, died 1235.
Herbert Fitz-Peter, son and heir, died 1248.
Reginald FitzPiers, brother and heir, died 1286.

Baron FitzReginald (1294)
John FitzReginald, summoned to parliament on 8 June 1294 until 26 January 1297. He was summoned again on 29 December 1299 until 26 August 1307. He died in 1310 and the title became extinct.

Citations

References
Nicolas, Nicholas Harris. A synopsis of the peerage of England exhibiting, under alphabetical arrangement, the date of creation, descent and present state of every title of peerage which has existed in this country since the conquest. J. Nichols and son, London, 1825.

1294 establishments in England
Baronies by writ
Extinct baronies in the Peerage of England